Emma Mitts (born June 12, 1955) is alderman of the 37th ward on Chicago's West Side. The predominantly African-American ward includes portions of Austin, West Garfield Park and West Humboldt Park. She has represented the ward since 2000.

Early life
Mitts was born June 12, 1955, in Elaine, Arkansas.

She eventually became a coordinator of special projects for the Chicago Department of Streets and Sanitation

Chicago City Council
Mitts was appointed by Richard M. Daley to the Chicago City Council in January 2000 to replace Percy Giles who had been indicted along with other city officials in Operation Silver Shovel. She has been reelected in 2003, 2007, 2011, 2015, and 2019.

In 2006, her ward received the first Wal-Mart in Chicago. She was an opponent of the 2006 Chicago Big Box Ordinance.

In the runoff of the 2019 Chicago mayoral election, Mitts endorsed Lori Lightfoot.

References

1955 births
21st-century American politicians
21st-century American women politicians
Chicago City Council members
Living people
People from Phillips County, Arkansas
Women city councillors in Illinois
Chicago City Council members appointed by Richard M. Daley
Illinois Democrats
African-American city council members in Illinois